Kayum Ayub (born 21 June 1947 in Kabul) is a retired Afghanistan wrestler, who competed at the 1968 Summer Olympic Games in the welterweight freestyle event.

References

External links
 

Wrestlers at the 1968 Summer Olympics
Afghan male sport wrestlers
Olympic wrestlers of Afghanistan
Sportspeople from Kabul
1947 births
Living people
20th-century Afghan people